Marino Riccardi (born 9 July 1958) is a politician from the nation of San Marino. He is a member of the Party of Democrats. He has been a captain-regent three times, from October 1991 to April 1992, from April 2004 until October 2004, and from October 2016 to April 2017.

References

1958 births
Captains Regent of San Marino
Members of the Grand and General Council
Living people
Party of Democrats politicians